The Cathedral & John Connon School is a co-educational private school founded in 1860 and located in Fort, Mumbai, Maharashtra. The school is widely considered to be amongst the best and most prestigious schools in India, housing five sections: Pre-Primary, Infant, Junior, Middle and Senior Schools.

The school also controls the 300-year-old St. Thomas Cathedral; CAJCS was founded to provide choristers to the Church.

History
In 1860 Bishop Harding and the Cathedral Chaplain opened a grammar school within the walled city of Bombay which, along with a smaller establishment for girls, were the first of many strands that have joined to form the Cathedral and John Connon School.

A Choir School, established with the objective of providing choristers for the St. Thomas Cathedral, Mumbai, the first Anglican Church in Mumbai was founded in October 1875. Meanwhile, the Bombay Scottish Education Society was founded in 1866. The society put up a building on the Esplanade, and named it for John Connon (then Chief Registrar of Bombay).

In 1878 a high school in Byculla, set up by the Bombay Diocesan Society, was merged with the Choir School to form the Cathedral High School. The present Senior School building, a blend of Indian and Gothic architecture, was erected in 1896. A girls' school had been started in 1880.

In 1922, in a public meeting held at the Town Hall, the present Asiatic Society of Bombay library, a suggestion was put forward by the principal of the Cathedral Boys' School for the Cathedral Schools and the Scottish School to work together, instead of competing, and thus the Anglo-Scottish Education Society was conceived. The schools were re-organized into the Cathedral Boys' School, the Cathedral Girls' School, and the John Connon School.

Today the old boys' school is the Senior School; the old girls' school is the Middle School; and the John Connon School is the Junior School. The Infant School, located at Malabar Hill, was set up in 1965. The Senior School also serves as the main administrative office for all the sections of the school.

The IB arm of the school, set up in 2015, plans to shift to the Deutsche Bank Building (formerly Tata Palace) by 2018. The building is located in the same vicinity (Fort) as the school, right next to Sterling Theatre.

In 2022 Meera Isaacs, the first woman principal of the school, retired after 26 years.

School badge
In 1923 the Cathedral Schools and the Scottish School were amalgamated to form The Anglo-Scottish Education Society. Miss Whitfield, the Principal of the Girls' School, wanted a badge which was representative of both elements of the Society: Anglican and Scottish. A badge was designed in which the Bishop's Mitre represented the Anglican side, while the Scottish neighbours were symbolised by the white diagonal cross of St. Andrew.

Academics and curriculum
The Cathedral & John Connon School is affiliated with the Council for the Indian School Certificate Examinations (CISCE), and its students appear for the council's ISC, IB (Grade 12) and IGCSE, ICSE (Grade 10) examinations. English is the medium of instruction. Hindi is taught as a second language and Marathi or Sanskrit are taught as third languages.

A Hindustan Times report of 2013 named it the best ICSE and ISC school in the country. It now offers the IBDP programme and IGCSE programme, as well.

Cathedral Model United Nations (Symposium)
The Cathedral Model United Nations is run entirely by the school's student body over a period of three days, where students assume the roles of delegates representing countries. From a start in 1996 - the first CMUN had only one committee (Asia and Pacific Council), it has grown into an event with over 700 delegates attending. CMUN 2007 was the first to have delegates from outside Mumbai. Schools like Mayo College, La Martiniere Calcutta, St. James' School, Doon School, Modern School Barakhamba Road, and others attended the conference. 2011 featured the first international delegates from Rato Bangala School from Nepal and Aitchinson College, Pakistan.

House system
There are four houses in the school - Barham, Palmer, Savage and Wilson - named after Barham (a canon), James Palmer (Bishop in Bombay), Arthur Savage and Percival Wilson, the founders of the Cathedral School and the John Connon School. The House System serves as the centre of school life, with students from the houses competing at sports, games and other co-curricular activities, primarily divided into 2 categories- Cultural and Sports which include a plethora of activities.

There was also another house, that was brown in color, called Kuruvilla that was later disbanded and students were distributed amongst the houses available since it made more sense to have four houses in order to keep competitions easier.

Notable alumni

Kiara Advani, Actress
Siddhartha Basu, TV Director and Producer
Rahul Bajaj, Chairman emeritus, Bajaj Group
Mandira Bedi, Actress
Homi J. Bhabha, Father of the Indian nuclear programme
Zulfikar Ali Bhutto, 9th Prime Minister of Pakistan
Rahul Bose, Indian film actor, director, screenwriter
Dhananjaya Y. Chandrachud Chief justice of India
Milind Deora, Indian politician and former Union Minister
Jamshyd Godrej, Industrialist and founder of the Godrej Group
Muhammad Ali Jinnah, Father of the Nation of Pakistan, Pakistan's first Governor-General, and leader of the All-India Muslim League
Karisma Kapoor, Actress
Durga Khote, Veteran Marathi & Hindi Film , Theater Actress and Producer
Anand Mahindra, Industrialist and Chairman of Mahindra & Mahindra
Rakesh Maria, Senior Indian Police Service officer and former Commissioner of the Mumbai Police
Sandeep Mathrani, CEO of WeWork
Khalid Mohamed, Film director and critic
Ehsaan Noorani, Musician, Shankar–Ehsaan–Loy fame
Salman Rushdie, Author
Jehangir Sabavala, Painter
Rajdeep Sardesai, Indian news anchor, journalist, and author
Ranvir Shah, Cultural Activist and Philanthropist
J. R. D. Tata, Tata Group
Nusli Wadia, Chairman of the Wadia Group, son of Neville Wadia and Dina Wadia, grandson of Muhammad Ali Jinnah and Rattanbai Jinnah
Fareed Zakaria, Indian-American author, political scientist, and CNN journalist
Cyrus Broacha, Indian TV anchor, theatre personality, comedian, political satirist, columnist, podcaster and author
Cyrus Mistry, Sixth Chairman of the Tata Group

See also
 List of schools in Mumbai
 List of the oldest schools in the world

References

External links
 

Church of North India schools
Schools in Colonial India
Primary schools in India
Christian schools in Maharashtra
High schools and secondary schools in Mumbai
Private schools in Mumbai
Educational institutions established in 1860
1860 establishments in India